Nuclear Command Authority may refer to:
 Nuclear Command Authority (India), the authority responsible for command, control and operational decisions regarding India's nuclear weapons programme
 National Command Authority (Pakistan), the command that oversees the deployment, research and development, and operational command and control of Pakistan's nuclear arsenal
 National Command Authority (United States)